This is part of a list of Statutes of New Zealand for the period of the Reform Government of New Zealand up to and including part of the first year of the United Government of New Zealand.

1900s

1912  

 Aged and Infirm Persons Protection Act  Amended: 1957/69/75
 Akaroa and Wainui Road District, Akaroa County, and Wairewa County Alteration o Act 
 Auckland Education Reserves Act 
 Barmaids Registration Act 
 Country Telephones-lines Act 
 Deputy Governor's Powers Act 
 Land Agents Act  Amended: 1955/56/59/61
 Mokau Harbour Board Empowering Act 
 New Plymouth Huatoki Stream Diversion and Exchange Act 
 Oamaru King George's Park Reserve Vesting Act 
 Plumbers Registration Act  Amended: 1950/55
 Public Service Act  Amended: 1927/46/50/51/52/54/59/60
 Tatum Trust Revocation Act 
 Tauranga Harbour Act  Amended: 1917
 Thomas George Macarthy Trust Act  Amended: 1972
 Waimairi County Differential Rate Empowering Act 
 Wellington and Karori Sanitation and Water-supply Act  Amended: 1915
 Westland Hospital and Charitable Aid Board Vesting and Empowering Act 
 Whakatane Harbour Act  Amended: 1915/16/17/20/22/28/50
Plus 49 Acts amended

1913  

 Amendment Acts Incorporation 1913 Act 
 Auckland City Empowering Act 
 Board of Agriculture Act 
 Christchurch Electrical Supply Empowering Act 
 Church of England Trusts Act  Amended: 1937/45/60
 City of Nelson Loans Conversion and Empowering Act  Amended: 1916
 Footwear Regulation Act  Amended: 1915
 Fruit-preserving Industry Act  Amended: 1914/15
 Gisborne Borough and Harbour Board Lands Exchange and Empowering Act 
 Hamilton High School Reserve Act 
 Irrigation and Water-supply Act 
 Kaitaia Land Drainage Act 
 Labour Disputes Investigation Act 
 McDougall Trust Estate Act 
 Methodist Union Act 
 New Zealand Institute of Architects Act  Amended: 1919/21
 Old-age Pensions Reciprocity Act 
 Rangiora Drill-shed Site Vesting Act 
 Science and Art Act 
 Springs County Council Reclamation and Empowering Act 
 State Advances Act  Amended: 1914/15/22/23
 Temporary Employees Act 
 Wanganui Borough Council Special Rate Empowering and Special Loan Act 
 Wanganui Borough Council Street Access Empowering Act  Amended: 1916
 Wanganui Harbour District and Empowering Act  Amended: 1923/26/29/35/37/54
 Western Taieri Land Drainage Board Enabling Act 
 Westport Public Parks Vesting Act 
 Whangarei Foreshore Vesting Act 
Plus 53 Acts amended

1914  

 Auckland City and Auckland Harbour Board Empowering Act 
 Christchurch Milk-supply and Markets Act  Amended: 1917
 Dunedin City Council Empowering Act 
 Education Act 1914 
 Eltham Drainage Board Act 
 Expeditionary Forces Voting Act 
 Iron and Steel Industries Act  Amended: 1920/25
 Local Railways Act  Amended: 1915/20/26/88
 Mortgages Extension Act  Amended: 1914/15/21
 Onehunga Borough Council Enabling Act 
 Port Ahuriri-Westshore Road and Railway Act 
 Railways Improvement Authorization Act  Amended: 1915
 Regulation of Trade and Commerce Act  Amended: 1915/17
 Remounts Encouragement Act 
 Riccarton Bush Act  Amended: 1947/49/64/72/79
 Southland Land Drainage Act  Amended: 1938
 Takapuna Borough Foreshore Vesting Act 
 Taumurunui Hospital District Act 
 Trading with the Enemy Act  Amended: 1915
 Waitara Harbour Board Empowering Act 
 War Contributions Validation Act 
 War Regulations Act  Amended: 1915/16
 War Risk Insurance Act 
 Whangarei Borough Land Vesting Act 
 Whangarei Harbour Board Empowering Act 
Plus 54 Acts amended and 1 Act repealed.

1915  

 Alien Enemy Teachers Act 
 Auckland City Markets and Empowering Act 
 Bluff Harbour Improvements Act 
 Cook Islands Act  Amended: 1921/25/26/46/48/50/52/54/56/57/60/61/62/63/64/65/66/67/70/74/80/82/2007
 Cost of Living Act 
 Devonport Borough Vesting Act 
 Discharged Soldiers Settlement Act  Amended: 1916/17/19/21/23/24
 Enemy Contracts Act 
 Expeditionary Forces Act  Amended: 1918
 Expiring Laws Continuance Act 
 Georgetti Trust Estate Act 
 Inglewood Borough Endowment Disposal Act 
 Lake Coleridge Water-power Act 
 Land Transfer Acts Compilation Act 
 Lights on Vehicles Act 
 Local Authorities Empowering Act 
 Military Manoeuvres Act 
 Miner's Phthisis Act 
 National Registration Act 
 Papakura Beach Vesting Act 
 Prisoners Detention Act 
 Public Expenditure Validation Act 
 Suspension of Disqualification During War Act 
 Swamp Drainage Act  Amended: 1922/26/28/48/77
 Tauranga Borough Council and Tauranga Harbour Board Empowering Act 
 Tauranga Foreshore Vesting and Endowment Act 
 Tokomaru Bay Harbour Act 
 War Funds Act  Amended: 1918/24/27
 War Pensions Act  Amended: 1916/17/23/35/36/40/45/46/47/49/50/51/55/57/58/60/61/62/63/64/65/66/67/68/69/70/71/72/73/74/75/76/77/78/79/80/81/82/83/86/88/90/91/96/2001/03/05/06
Plus 62 Acts amended

1916  

 Auckland City Parks Improvement and Empowering Act 
 Christchurch Rating Agreements Enabling Act 
 Cinematograph-film Censorship Act  Amended: 1926
 Gisborne Borough Gas Act 
 Invercargill Athenaeum Act 
 Land and Income Tax Act  Amended: 1920/22/24/25/26/27/29/30/31/32/33/35/36/39/40/41/44/45/46/49/50/51/52/53/54/55/56/57/58/59/60/61/62/63/64/65/66/67/68/69/70/71/72/73/74/75/76
 Military Service Act  Amended: 1917/20
 New Zealand Insurance Company Trust Act 
 Orchard-tax Act  Amended: 1921/33/34
 Parliamentary Elections Postponement Act 
 Waimakariri Harbour District and Empowering Act  Amended: 1917/20/24
 Wairau Harbour Board Loan and Enabling Act 
 Wellington Methodist Charitable and Educational Trusts Act  Amended: 1974
Plus 13 Acts amended

1917  

 Day's Bay Sanitation and Water-supply Act 
 Manawatu County Loan and Empowering Act  Amended: 1919
 Napier Harbour Board Empowering and Vesting Act 
 Nelson Harbour Board Empowering Act  Amended: 1953
 New Zealand Inscribed Stock Act 
 Registration of Aliens Act  Amended: 1920
 Revocation of Naturalization Act  Amended: 1920
 Sale of Liquor Restriction Act 
 Social Hygiene Act 
 State Supply of Electrical Energy Act  Amended: 1956/57/58/59/60/61/64/65
 War Legislation Act  Amended: 1916
 War Purposes Loan Act 
 Wellington City Trading Departments' Reserve and Renewal Funds Act  Amended: 1950
 Western Taieri Land Drainage Act 
 Whangarei Harbour Board Vesting Act  Amended: 1951
Plus 17 Acts amended

1918  

 Auckland Harbour Board, Devonport Borough Council, and Devonport Domain Board Act 
 Auckland Institute and Museum Site Empowering Act 
 Aviation Act 
 Dunedin City Fish-markets and Empowering Act 
 Electric-power Boards Act  Amended: 1919/20/21/22/23/27/28/47
 Invercargill Borough Council Special Rate Empowering Act  Amended: 1921
 John Donald Macfarlane Estate Administration Empowering Act 
 Military Decorations and Distinctive Badges Act  Amended: 1969/74
 Napier Harbour Board and Napier High School Empowering Act  Amended: 1921
 Napier Harbour Board Loans Enabling Act 
 New Plymouth Borough and Harbour Board Exchange Act 
 Orari and Waihi Rivers Act 
 Rangitata River Act 
 Repatriation Act 
 Thames Borough Boundaries Alteration Act 
 Uawa County Act 
 Whangarei Borough Empowering Act  Amended: 1922
Plus 13 Acts amended

1919  

 Auckland University College Site Act 
 Board of Trade Act  Amended: 1923
 Charles Joseph Jury Estate Empowering Act 
 Discharged Soldiers Settlement Loans Act 
 Education Purposes Loans Act 
 Electric-power Works Loan Act 
 External Affairs Act  Amended: 1920
 Fishing Industry Promotion Act 
 Greytown Borough Loan Empowering Act 
 Hauraki Plains, Thames, Ohinemuri, and Piako Counties Act 
 Housing Act  Amended: 1920/21/25/40/56/71/80/88/92
 Howard Estate Act  Amended: 1926/27/85/88
 Inglewood County Act 
 Manawatu Gorge Road and Bridge Act 
 Matakaoa County Act 
 Official Appointments and Documents Act 
 Palmerston North Abattoir Act 
 Statutes Repeal and Expiring Laws Continuance Act 
 Tauranga Borough Council Electric Loans Empowering Act 
 Tauranga Harbour Board Empowering Act  Amended: 1921
 Tolaga Bay Harbour Act 
 Treaties of Peace Act  Amended: 1920
 Undesirable Immigrants Exclusion Act 
 Victory Park Act 
 Waimakariri Harbour Board Reserve Act 
 Wellington City Abattoir Charges and Renewal Fund Act 
 Wellington City Abattoir Loan Act 
 Westport Technical School Site Act 
 Whangarei Harbour Board Vesting and Empowering Act  Amended: 1954
 Women's Parliamentary Rights Act 
Plus 35 Acts amended

1920s

1920  
 Anzac Day Act  Amended: 1921/96
 Bay of Islands Harbour Act  Amended: 1922/30/36
 Dunedin City Corporation Empowering Act  Amended: 1927/30/44
 Health Act  Amended: 1940/47/51/54/58/59/60/61/62/67/70/71/72/73/75/76/78/79/80/82/87/88/93/94/98/2005/06
 Masseurs Registration Act  Amended: 1924/35
 Native Trustee Act  Amended: 1921/22/24/26/29
 Offenders Probation Act  Amended: 1930
 Rotorua Town Lands Act  Amended: 1977
 Statutes Drafting and Compilation Act  Amended: 1973/88/95
 Taieri River Improvement Act  Amended: 1921/32/39
 Te Aroha Crown Leases Act 
 Thames Harbour Board Loan and Empowering Act  Amended: 1923
 Wanganui Borough Council Empowering Act 
 Wanganui Borough Council Empowering and Acquisition Act 
 War Regulations Continuance Act 
 Westport Harbour Act  Amended: 1912/26/79
Plus 66 Acts amended

1921  
 Animals Protection and Game Act 
 Auckland Electric-power Board Act  Amended: 1924/26/37/38
 Companies Temporary Empowering Act 
 Forests Act  Amended: 1925/26/48/53/60/64/65/67/70/71/72/73/76/79/81/83/87/93/94/95/96/2004/05
 Geraldine County River District Act  Amended: 1938
 Grey Collection Exchange Act 
 Hunter Gift for the Settlement of Discharged Soldiers Act  Amended: 1979
 Insurance Companies' Deposits Act  Amended: 1922/50/58/71/72/74/77/82/83/2006
 Judea Land Drainage Board Empowering Act 
 Loan Companies Act 
 Local Bodies' Finance Act 
 Meat-export Control Act  Amended: 1924
 Mortgages and Deposits Extension Act 
 Napier Harbour Board Enabling Act 
 Palmerston North Borough Loans Consolidation Act 
 Public Expenditure Adjustment Act 
 Samoa Act  Amended: 1923/26/27/38/47/49/51/52/53/54/56/57/59
 Tauranga Borough Council Electric Loan Empowering Act 
 Tolaga Bay Harbour Board Empowering Act 
 Treaties of Peace Extension Act 
 Urewera Lands Act 
 Waikato and King-country Counties Act 
Plus 49 Acts amended

1922  
 Administration of Justice Act 
 Aid to Public Works and Land Settlements Act 
 Amusements-tax Act  Amended: 1923/24
 Auckland City and Auckland Hospital Board Empowering Act 
 Christchurch Municipal Offices Leasing Act 
 Fireblight Act 
 Horouta District Licensing Poll Act 
 Hutt River Improvement and Reclamation Act 
 Main Highways Act  Amended: 1925/26/27/28/36
 Paeroa Water-supply Transfer Validation Act 
 Petone and Lower Hutt Gas-lighting Act  Amended: 1926/27/33
 Rotorua Borough Act  Amended: 1925
 Rural Credit Associations Act 
 Scaffolding and Excavation Act  Amended: 1924/48/51
 Sea Carriage of Goods Act  Amended: 1962/68/85
 Thames Harbour Act 
 Waimakariri River Improvement Act  Amended: 1926/27/30/33/70/86
 Wairau Harbour Board Empowering Act 
 Wairau River District Loans Act 
 War Disabilities Removal Act 
 Whangarei Borough Leasing Empowering Act 
Plus 50 Acts amended

1923  
 Apprentices Act  Amended: 1925/27/30/46/57/61/64/67/68/70/72/74/76/77
 Auckland Harbour Board and Takapuna Borough Council Empowering Act 
 Baptist Union Incorporation Act  Amended: 1970
 Companies Special Empowering Act 
 Dairy-produce Export Control Act  Amended: 1924/26
 Manawatu-Oroua River District Act  Amended: 1925/29
 Masterton Trust Lands Trustees Empowering Act 
 Registration of Aliens Suspension Act 
 Rent Restriction Continuance Act 
 St John's College Trust Act  Amended: 1957
 Stamp Duties Act Postponement Act 
 Wellington City Empowering and Special Rates Consolidation Act  Amended: 1933
Plus 35 Acts amended

1924  
 Acts Interpretation Act  Amended: 1908/20/60/62/73/79/83/86/88/94/96
 Auckland City Abattoir Act 
 Auckland City and Auckland Museum Empowering Act 
 Births and Deaths Registration Act  Amended: 1912/15/20/30/47/53/55/59/61/63/64/69/70/72/76/82/91/93
 Companies Empowering Act  Amended: 1931
 Dannevirke Hospital District Act 
 Engineers Registration Act  Amended: 1928/44/66/72/77/88/96
 Fruit Control Act  Amended: 1932
 Hauraki Plains County Council Empowering Act 
 Honey-export Control Act 
 Mortgages Final Extension Act 
 Motor-vehicles Act  Amended: 1927/34/36
 New Plymouth Borough and New Plymouth Harbour Board Exchange Act 
 New Plymouth Borough Council Empowering Act 
 Opotiki Hospital District Act 
 Poultry Act  Amended: 1961/75
 Rangiora Borough Valuation of Farm Lands for Rating Purposes Act 
 Rent Restriction Act 
 Rhodes Memorial Convalescent Home Act 
 Roman Catholic Bishop of Dunedin Empowering Act 
 Seddon Family Burial-ground Act 
 South Invercargill Borough Wards Validating Act 
 Spiritualist Church of New Zealand Act 
 Thomas Cawthron Trust Act  Amended: 1966/76/81/85/93
 Wanganui City Council Special Rate Empowering and Enabling Act 
 Wanganui City Council Vesting and Empowering Act  Amended: 1942
 Wanganui-Rangitikei Electric-power Board Enabling Act 
 Wellington City Mangahao Endowment Sale Empowering Act 
 Whakatane Borough Empowering Act 
Plus 45 Acts amended

1925  
 Ashley River Improvement Act  Amended: 1927/37
 Brunner Borough Abolition Act 
 Child Welfare Act  Amended: 1927/48/54/58/60/61/64/65
 Deteriorated Lands Act 
 District Courts Abolition Act 
 Electrical Wiremen's Registration Act  Amended: 1928/34
 Hutt Valley Lands Settlement Act  Amended: 1926/27
 Kauri-gum Control Act 
 Local Elections and Polls Act  Amended: 1908/11/13/26/32/34/41/44/46/47/50/53/56/57/58/60/61/62/63/67/68/69/70/74/77/80/82/86/88/89/91/92/94
 Marine and Power Engineers' Institute Incorporation Act 
 Massey Burial-ground Act  Amended: 1981
 Matakaoa Hospital District Act 
 Matamata County Council Empowering Act 
 Mataura Borough Valuation of Farm Lands for Rating Purposes Act 
 Napier Harbour Board Rating Regulation Act 
 Nurses and Midwives Registration Act  Amended: 1926/30/33/39/43/44
 Rawhiti Domain Act 
 Repayment of the Public Debt Act 
 Valuation of Land Act  Amended: 1908/12/20/21/26/27/33/45/64/65/67/68/70/71/72/76/78/81/85/88/89/91/94
 Wanganui City Council Empowering and Enabling Act 
Plus 29 Acts amended

1926  
 Auckland City Council Empowering Act 
 Eastbourne Borough Bank Account and Empowering Act 
 Family Allowances Act  Amended: 1936
 Guardianship of Infants Act  Amended: 1927/61
 Kaituna River District Act  Amended: 1959/61
 Local Government Loans Board Act  Amended: 1954
 Local Legislation Act 
 Maori Arts and Crafts Act 
 Mildred Elaine Smyth Divorce Act 
 Motor-omnibus Traffic Act 
 Napier Harbour Board and Napier Borough Enabling Act  Amended: 1949
 New Zealand Agricultural College Act 
 Oil in Territorial Waters Act 
 Peel Forest Act  Amended: 1927
 Petone Borough Council Empowering Act 
 Reserves and other Lands Disposal Act 
 Rural Advances Act 
 Scientific and Industrial Research Act  Amended: 1931/45/58/61/63/65/66/72/79/85/87/90
 Town-planning Act  Amended: 1929/48
 Tutukaka, Whangaruru, and Whananaki Harbours Control Act 
 Veterinary Surgeons Act  Amended: 1964/92
 Whangarei County Council Empowering Act 
Plus 56 Acts amended

1927  
 Dangerous Drugs Act  Amended: 1928/60/63
 Fertilizers Act  Amended: 1948
 Fungicides and Insecticides Act 
 Greytown Trust Lands Trustees Empowering Act 
 Introduction of Plants Act 
 Lower Hutt Borough Council Empowering Act 
 Makerua Drainage Board Loan Empowering Act 
 Massey Agricultural College Act  Amended: 1958
 Motor-spirits Taxation Act  Amended: 1928
 Napier Foreshore Act 
 Napier Harbour Board Loans Enabling Act 1918 Extension Act 
 New Zealand Institute of Horticulture Act 
 Newmarket Borough Council Vesting and Empowering Act 
 Palmerston North Library Empowering Act 
 Rural Intermediate Credit Act  Amended: 1929/31/46/54/65/78
 Seeds Importation Act 
 St Peter's Parish Endowment Fund Act 
 Summer Time Act  Amended: 1933
 Te Matai Road Water-race District Act 
 Wellington City and Suburban Districts Ambulance Transport Service Act 
 Wellington City and Suburban Water-supply Act  Amended: 1929/30/35/47
 Wellington City Exhibition Grounds Act  Amended: 1930
 Whakatane County Council Empowering and Loan-moneys Diversion Act 
Plus 44 Acts amended

1928  
 Auckland Transport Board Act  Amended: 1955/60/63
 Auckland War Memorial Museum Maintenance Act  Amended: 1931/45/53/63/80
 Buller County Leasing Empowering Act 
 Canterbury Provincial Buildings Vesting Act  Amended: 1988
 Church of England Empowering Act  Amended: 1966
 Cinematograph Films Act  Amended: 1929/34/53/56/60/62/67/69/70/77/80
 Hanmer Crown Leases Act 
 Hutt River Board Empowering Act 
 Johnsonville and Makara Gas-supply Act 
 London and New Zealand Bank, Limited Act 
 Lyttelton Harbour Board Loan Enabling Act 
 Methodist Theological College Edson Trust Extension Act 
 Motueka Borough Council Library Act 
 Music-teachers Registration Act 
 Napier Borough and Napier Harbour Board Enabling Act 
 Onerahi Water Reserve Enabling Act 
 Opticians Act  Amended: 1934/55/62/65/66
 Orchard and Garden Diseases Act  Amended: 1914/20/40/50
 Papanui Memorial Hall Management Act 
 Post and Telegraph Act  Amended: 1910/11/13/15/19/20/22/24/27/33/36/44/47/48/53/56/57
 Public Reserves, Domains, and National Parks Act 
 Statutory Land Charges Registration Act  Amended: 1930/59/71/80
 Surveyors Registration Act 
 Thames Borough Loans Rate Adjustment Act 
 Timaru Borough Empowering Act 
 Tumu-Kaituna Drainage Board Empowering Act 
 Wairarapa Electric-power Board Empowering Act 
 Whangarei Abattoir-site Extension Act 
Plus 27 Acts amended

See also 
The above list may not be current and will contain errors and omissions. For more accurate information try:
 Walter Monro Wilson, The Practical Statutes of New Zealand, Auckland: Wayte and Batger 1867
 The Knowledge Basket: Legislation NZ
 New Zealand Legislation Includes some Imperial and Provincial Acts. Only includes Acts currently in force, and as amended.
 Legislation Direct List of statutes from 2003 to order

Lists of statutes of New Zealand